Otto II, the Rich (1125 – 18 February 1190), a member of the House of Wettin, was Margrave of Meissen from 1156 until his death.

Life
He was the eldest surviving son of Conrad, Margrave of Meissen and Lusatia. When his father, under pressure from Emperor Frederick Barbarossa, retired and entered the Augustinian convent of Lauterberg in 1156, Otto succeeded him in Meissen while his younger brothers Theodoric and Dedi received the March of Lusatia and the County of Groitzsch with Rochlitz.

The partition meant a weakening of the Wettin rule, and Otto's Imperial politics remained rather ineffective. He had to stand by and watch the emperor's extension of power in the Pleissnerland territory around Altenburg, Chemnitz and Zwickau; moreover he picked an unsuccessful quarrel with the rising burgraves of Dohna in the Eastern Ore Mountains. Together with Archbishop Wichmann of Magdeburg he joined Emperor Frederick's expedition against the rebellious Saxon duke Henry the Lion in 1179, however, he failed to benefit from his downfall.

Otto's domestic policies were more successful: about 1165 he vested the citizens of Leipzig, located at the crossways of the Via Regia and Via Imperii trade routes, with town privileges and founded the St. Nicholas Church. He also established Altzella Abbey on the Miriquidi estates on the slopes of the Ore Mountains he had received from the emperor, where silver was discovered near Christiansdorf in 1168. The new mining town (Bergstadt) of Freiberg and its revenues soon became one of the margrave's most important sources of income, earning him the later epithet "the Rich".

In his later years, Otto had to cope with fierce inheritance quarrels between his sons Albert and Theoderic. The margrave preferred the younger brother Theodoric and in turn was captured and arrested by Albert, who was backed by Otto's brother Dedi and his son Conrad. Emperor Frederick enforced his release from detention, nevertheless Albert could assert his claims and succeeded his father as margrave. The fraternal feud, however, lingered on until Albert's sudden death (presumably poisoned) in 1195.

Marriage and children
Otto married Hedwig of Brandenburg, a daughter of the Ascanian margrave Albert the Bear. The couple had four children:
 Albert I (1158-1195), Margrave of Meissen from 1190, married Sophia, daughter of Duke Frederick of Bohemia
 Adelaide of Meissen (1160-1211), married King Ottokar I of Bohemia in 1198
 Theodoric I (1162-1221), Margrave of Meissen from 1195, married Jutta of Thuringia, daughter of Landgrave Hermann I
 Sophia of Meissen, married Duke Oldřich of Olomouc.

References

Sources

 

1125 births
1190 deaths
Margraves of Meissen
House of Wettin
People from Freiberg
Burials at Altzella Abbey